The languages of the Bomberai Peninsula of Indonesian New Guinea fall into several groups:
West Bomberai languages (Papuan, west and south)
Irarutu language (Austronesian, most of the interior)
North Bomberai languages (Austronesian, off the coast)
Bedoanas–Erokwanas languages (minor Austronesian languages labeled 'Bomberai' in Ethnologue)